Massachusetts House of Representatives' 7th Plymouth district in the United States is one of 160 legislative districts included in the lower house of the Massachusetts General Court. It covers part of Plymouth County. Republican Alyson Sullivan of Abington has represented the district since 2019.

Towns represented
The district includes the following localities:
 Abington
 part of East Bridgewater
 Whitman

The current district geographic boundary overlaps with those of the Massachusetts Senate's Norfolk and Plymouth district, Norfolk, Bristol and Plymouth district, and 2nd Plymouth and Bristol district.

Former locales
The district previously covered:
 Marion, circa 1872
 Wareham, circa 1872

Representatives
 John M. Kinney, circa 1858
 Marshall E. Simmons, circa 1859
 John W. Delano, circa 1888
 Morrill S. Ryder, circa 1920
 Adolph Johnson, circa 1951
 Charles A. Mackenzie, Jr., circa 1975
 Andrew Card
 Emmet Hayes
 Michael J. Sullivan
 Ronald Whitney
 Kathleen Teahan
 Allen McCarthy
 Geoff Diehl
 Alyson M. Sullivan, 2019–present

See also
 List of Massachusetts House of Representatives elections
 Other Plymouth County districts of the Massachusetts House of Representatives: 1st, 2nd, 3rd, 4th, 5th, 6th, 8th, 9th, 10th, 11th, 12th
 List of Massachusetts General Courts
 List of former districts of the Massachusetts House of Representatives

Images
Portraits of legislators

References

External links
 Ballotpedia
  (State House district information based on U.S. Census Bureau's American Community Survey).

House
Government of Plymouth County, Massachusetts